Critical Role: Vox Machina Origins is a comic series based on the American Dungeons & Dragons web series Critical Role. The comics act as a prequel story and covers how the characters became the adventuring party known as Vox Machina before the events of the web series. 

The first six issues were published digitally, starting from September 2017, followed by print collections of the issues. A second set of six issues followed, both digitally and in print, and was also collected into a printed volume. A third volume has been announced, with its first issue released on February 10, 2021.

Plot summary

Volume 1 
The half-elven rogue Vax'ildan and the ranger Vex'ahlia, his twin sister, are investigating the swamp near the city of Stilben on behalf of peasant residents who believe a curse is responsible for killing their children. After they battle shark-speakers, a squirrel reveals itself to be the half-elven druid Keyleth who then heals Vax. Keyleth is also investigating the swamp, on behalf of a sorcerer friend, to verify if the swamp is being poisoned rather than cursed. The twins return to the city to track down the alchemist who informed the peasants that the swamp was cursed. The alchemist heads to a meeting; Iselda steps out of a mirror and informs him that she'll take care of the people following him. In a nearby ally, the twins fend off an attack.

The gnome bard Scanlan and the goliath barbarian Grog, along with other mercenaries, successfully raid a fish-god temple and return to Stilben to have an alchemist identify a potion they recovered. Upon arrival to the alchemist's shop, the group is attacked and a member is killed. Later, after recounting their tale at a tavern, they are approached by the dragonborn sorcerer Tiberius who identifies the potion as a type of poison used by an assassins guild based in Wildemount and buys the vial. Keyleth and Tiberius attend a meeting where their group is given twelve hours by the Clasp, a criminal guild, to identify what is killing the peasants; Keyleth and Tiberius spilt off to investigate on their own. Each pair manages to track down the alchemist hiding in a sewer lair at the same time, leading them to attack each other before grouping together to fend off an attack from the alchemist's allies. While initially successful, the group is attacked by Iselda who ambushes them by stepping out of a mirror; she seriously damages the group before fleeing through the mirror with the alchemist. Tiberius identifies her as a member of the Myriad, a Wildemount crime syndicate.

After healing up, each pair splits up again. Vax is then kidnapped by Iselda; Vex seeks help from both Scanlan and Grog's group and Tiberius and Keyleth's group. Neither group can help, so Vex storms off but Keyleth follows after and joins Vex who retrieves her pet bear Trinket. Vex, Keyleth, Tiberius, Scanlan and Grog converge on the docks as a nearby ship explodes; Vax has managed to escape on his own. As a group, they storm the ship and discover that both a poison and a ritual spell are being used to harm the swamp the peasants depend on. After creatively diluting the spell, they are attacked by Iselda who transforms into a fiend. While almost being overwhelmed, Grog kills Iselda and the group decides to get to know one another.

Volume 2 
Following another successful job in Stilben, the party celebrates in a tavern; in the middle of the night, Grog has a vision of his father and leaves. At breakfast, the group realize that Grog is missing and the twins learn from the city guard that a goliath with an ax left at dawn heading towards Westruun. They decide to go after Grog except for Tiberius who splits off to pursue research in the Ashen Gorge, the opposite direction. Their investigation in Westruun leads them to the home of the gnome cleric Pike and her great-great-grandfather Wilhand Trickfoot. Pike informs them that Grog is a childhood friend; Pike then channels her god, the Everlight, and scries on Grog. Her spell reveals that Grog is in a nearby mountain known for madness and she decides to join the group to rescue him. 

On their journey, Pike tells the party that Grog protected Wilhand from a group of half-giants, including Grog's uncle, who then proceeded to beat Grog to near death. Wilhand and Pike took Grog in and nursed him back to health. Inside the mountain, the group discover a tattered shadow skeletal creature, Drath Mephrun, who has magically ensnared Grog along with a bunch of skeletons, including Grog's father. They beat the creature, rescue Grog who is left with an itchy scar, and then bury Grog's father. Back in Westruun, they look for help to heal Grog's scar; however, at the Temple Ward, they are informed Lady Kima of Vord is away on pilgrimage and at Greystone Tower, they are informed that Realmseer Eskil Ryndarien has a nine week long waitlist. Regrouping at a tavern, they are approached by Drez Vina, a representative of the Realmseer's rival, who offers them a way into his tower if the group agrees to steal an object from the tower.  

After agreeing, the group infiltrate the mage tower; the group's behavior and discussion (including the decision to not steal the object) intrigue Eskil who then identifies Grog's scar as a curse that will allow Drath Mephrun to return via a makeshift lichdom ritual. Eskil can cure Grog but only if the group splits up to retrieve two components. Vex, Vax, and Grog head to the Frostweald Forest to retrieve the heart of a nymph. Overcoming basilisks, they reach the nymph's sanctuary; while the twins discuss a plan of action, Grog walks up to the nymph who then whisks him away via portal and then returns him to the sanctuary with a nymph's heart. Pike, Scanlan, and Keyleth head to the Umbra Hills to retrieve the scull of a nightmare. In Jorenn Village, their investigation leads them to a local jail where they discover gunslinger Percival Fredrickstein von Musel Klossowski de Rolo III. Percy was pursuing a doctor who was meeting a local cult; the cult plans on summoning a nightmare. Subsequent a jailbreak, Percy helps them fight the cult, kill the nightmare and then joins the group. Upon regrouping, Eskil begins the ritual but Grog is possessed by Drath Mephrun. The group successfully fight to keep Grog in the ritual circle until Eskil destroys the near-lich. Eskil informs them that they now owe him a favor; later in the tavern, Drez Vina informs the group that they now owe his master a favor for failing at the job.

Publication history

Creative origins 

Critical Role began as a private Dungeons & Dragons game with Matthew Mercer as the Dungeon Master and creator of the Exandria setting. Each cast member created their own character to play in the campaign. When Geek & Sundry moved "the group's existing home game into its studio" as a weekly web series in 2015, the story of Vox Machina started in media res. Prior to the publication of Vox Machina: Origins, most information on the group's adventures pre-stream came from a short video summary. Critical Role: Vox Machina Origins is an adaptation of the group's game before the show.

Volume 1 
In July 2017, at the 2017 San Diego Comic-Con, it was announced that a comic covering the origin of Vox Machina would be published. It was written by Matthew Colville, drawn by Olivia Samson (a long-time member of the Critical Role community), and both colored and lettered by Chris Northrop. In September 2017, Geek & Sundry announced that they partnered with Dark Horse Comics to publish the comic book and that it would be available digitally beginning September 2017. 

The first digital issue was released on September 20, 2017 with a cover by Deborah Hauber. On May 31, 2018, two hardcover editions collecting Critical Role: Vox Machina Origins #1–#6 were released. Both editions include annotated cover process pieces, preliminary character sketches, and character descriptions with stats. The limited edition is bound in faux leather and came with a lithograph and cloth portfolio, all housed in a faux leather slipcase. The limited edition is now out of print. A trade paperback, Critical Role: Vox Machina Origins Volume 1 was released on October 15, 2019.

Volume 2 
Following successful sales of the first mini-series, Dark Horse announced on March 11, 2019 that a second volume, also of six issues, would continue the Vox Machina Origins story. The second volume was released as a print comic instead of a digital first comic. Critical Role: Vox Machina Origins Volume 2 was written by Jody Houser, drawn by Olivia Samson, colored by MSASSYK, lettered by Ariana Maher, and published by Dark Horse Comics. In an interview, Houser said, "I have an outline from the Critical Role folks. They do give notes on each issue to make sure character voices/details and other elements such as the way spells work are consistent. It’s a collaborative process.

Issue one was released digitally and in print on July 10, 2019. The six issues were collected as a trade paperback that released on August 12, 2020. A hardcover limited edition collecting these issues was also released on August 18, 2020 with a faux-leather cover and slipcase along with a lithograph art print.

On June 15, 2020, an omnibus hardcover edition collecting the first two volumes of Critical Role: Vox Machina Origins was announced. Critical Role: Vox Machina Origins Library Edition Vol. 1 was published by Dark Horse Comics and released first in comic book stores on November 11, 2020, and then followed with a wide release on November 24, 2020. On Women Write About Comics, reviewer Nola Pfau called the omnibus "MASSIVE. It’s larger than a comic, it’s larger even than a D&D book. It’s 12¼” tall, 9¼” wide, and 1¼” thick, three hundred and twenty glossy, thick pages, and it weighs…look, I dunno, a ton? I feel like I could do arm curls with it to tone my biceps."

Volume 3 
In June 2020, ComicBook reported that on the last page of the final issue of Critical Role: Vox Machina Origins Volume 2 there was a small textbox that promised "the adventures would continue in Vox Machina Origins Series 3." In September 2020, it was announced that the creative team of the second volume would return for the third volume and that the first issue would be released on December 9, 2020. However, the release was delayed and the first issue was released on February 10, 2021. A trade paperback, collecting the volume's six issues, is scheduled to be released on November 2, 2022. A hardcover limited edition collecting these issues is also set to be released on November 2, 2022 with a faux-leather cover and slipcase along with a lithograph art print.

Reception

Sales 
In The New York Times Best Seller list for November 2019, Critical Role: Vox Machina Origins Volume 1 was 12th in "Graphic Books and Manga". In USA Today's Best Seller list for October 24, 2019, Critical Role: Vox Machina Origins Volume 1 was 96th. In the Diamond Comic Distributors' "Best-Selling Graphic Novels" sales list, Critical Role: Vox Machina Origins Volume 1 was 8th in October 2019 and 27th in the January 2020 list; in their "Top 500 Graphic Novels: Year 2019", the trade paperback was 57th "based on total unit sales of products invoiced". In 2019, Critical Role: Vox Machina Origins was Dark Horse's 6th best selling title with 19,000 copies sold.

In The New York Times Best Seller list for September 2020, Critical Role: Vox Machina Origins Volume 2 was 13th in "Graphic Books and Manga". In Publishers Weekly's "Best-selling Books Week Ending August 23, 2020", Critical Role: Vox Machina Origins Volume 2 was 6th in "Trade Paperbacks". In USA Today's Best Seller list for August 27, 2020, Critical Role: Vox Machina Origins Volume 2 was 109th.

Reviews 
Critical Role: Vox Machina Origins (the first volume) was 8th on CBR's "10 Best Comic Books & Graphic Novels Any D&D Player Should Read" list. Steve Gustafson, for 411Mania, gave the first issue of Critical Role: Vox Machina Origins Volume 1 an 8 out of 10 and wrote: "Samson’s art is quite nice, and complements Mercer and Colville’s storytelling well. The fantasy art brings to mind a cleaner, more defined tone than a book like Saga, differentiating itself nicely. [...] All in all, Vox Machina – Origins serves as an effective jumping-off point for people who want to learn what all the Critical Role fuss is about, but it also stands strong as its own thing too. There’s enough here for readers to want to keep progressing". In coverage of ComiXology's Bestseller List for April 21, 2018, Bleeding Cool highlighted that "Critical Role: Vox Machina Origins has been a huge digital success. Based on the popular roleplaying podcast, Critical Role, and only available digitally, this surprise hit has managed to beat Mister Miracle".

Cori McCreery, for WWAC, highlighted that Tiberius was written out of the prequel comic in the second volume. She wrote, "Part of the beauty of adaptations is that you can change things that no longer fit the story you want to tell. The Critical Role team had a falling out with the actor who played Tiberius, and the character wound up leaving the game pretty early on into the stream, and leaving a bit of a conundrum for adaptations like this and the upcoming cartoon. [...] So while I don’t know if they’re writing the character out in the comics earlier than he left the game, I do know that they do not plan to use him in the animated series, despite his being present for some of the adventures there. I’d be perfectly fine if this adaptation took a page from the medium it’s part of and provides everyone with a retcon of the group’s past".

Christian Hoffer, for ComicBook, gave the sixth issue of Critical Role: Vox Machina Origins Volume 2 a rating of 4 out of 5 and wrote: "Critical Role's second miniseries ends in a bit of a rushed fashion, but it's still an enjoyable one and hints at greater adventures to come. [...] There's still tons of great character moments and most importantly the feeling that Vox Machina's adventures are just getting started."

Christian Hoffer also gave the first issue of Critical Role: Vox Machina Origins Volume 3 a rating of 4 out of 5 and wrote: "After Vox Machina spends away their latest earnings on various pleasures (the montage is one of the best parts of these comics so far and perfectly captures the personalities of the team), the group is recruited for an underground fighting ring that may be more than meets the eye. Another solid comic that only requires the scantest of information about Critical Role to enjoy. This remains one of the best fantasy comics on stands today".

Collected editions

References 

Vox Machina Origins
Dark Horse Comics titles
Fantasy comics
Works based on Dungeons & Dragons